Flight 621 may refer to:

LAN Chile Flight 621, crashed on 3 April 1961
Air Canada Flight 621, crashed on 5 July 1970

0621